The Society may refer to:

The Society (Church of England), an independent association of Church of England clergy and lay people
The Society (TV series), a 2019 series on Netflix
The Society (ex Danse Society), a gothic rock band

See also
Society (disambiguation)